Rosemary Margaret Smith (1933–2004) was a Scottish botanist and illustrator who specialized in the taxonomy of the Zingiberaceae, or ginger family. Many of the species she classified and identified as being placed into improper genera were found in Asian countries, especially in the isolated island of Borneo.

Elettariopsis smithiae, a species of ginger native to Malaysia and Thailand, is named in honour of her. In 2001, a genus titled Smithatris was named after her, the two species in the genus being Smithatris supraneanae and Smithatris myanmarensis.

Career
The Malay rose was first described by Henry Nicholas Ridley as Hornstedtia venusta, but Smith determined that it should be placed in the genus Etlingera, becoming Etlingera venusta. The genus Paracautleya was among the earliest defined by Smith, though it was later determined by Skornickova and Sabu (2005) that there were not enough physically differentiating traits to consider the monophyletic species separate from the genus Curcuma. Alongside B. L. Burtt in 1986, Smith identified that many of the species that should have been included in the genus Etlingera had been mistakenly put into incorrect genera by researchers in the prior century. Together, they have classified several species unique to Asian countries, including shell ginger. In reviewing the genus Amomum exclusive to Borneo, Smith was responsible for subdividing the large number of species in the genus into five groups. Similarly, she separated the Plagiostachys species in Borneo into two separate groups based on their general physical structure. She was able to identify five species of Scaphochlamys that had been misidentified, with two having been mistakenly placed into the genus Haplochorema.

In 1982, Smith published her research on ginger species at Gunung Mulu National Park in Malaysia. From this investigation, she was able to identify special characteristics of the genus Boesenbergia. While continuing her research in Borneo, Smith's publications in 1987 classified the six key physiological distinctions between the genera Scaphochlamys, Distichochlamys and Boesenbergia. Complications over the division of the genus Alpinia into separate genera were solved as a first step by Smith in 1990 when she created the genus Pleuranthodium and included in it 22 newly renamed species.

From 1963 to 1979 her illustrations were published with the "Plant of the Week" column in The Scotsman with text by Alf Evans.

Selected publications

Classifications
* Bolded names were discovered, named, or reclassified by Smith. Only a partial list is included.
 Acanthaceae (Acanthus family)
 Linariantha
 Linariantha bicolor
 Zingiberaceae (Ginger family)
 Alpinia (Shell ginger genus)
 Alpinia beamanii
 Alpinia zerumbet (Shell ginger)
 Amomum
 Amomum borneense
 Amomum epiphyticum
 Elettaria
 Elettaria surculosa
 Etlingera (Torch ginger genus)
 Etlingera brachychila
 Etlingera elatior (Torch ginger)
 Etlingera pauciflora
 Etlingera pubescens
 Etlingera sessilanthera
 Hedychium
 Hedychium griersonianum
 Plagiostachys
 Plagiostachys bracteolata
 Plagiostachys crocydocalyx
 Pleuranthodium
 Scaphochlamys
 Scaphochlamys argentea
 Scaphochlamys petiolata
 Scaphochlamys polyphylla
 Scaphochlamys reticosa

References

Further reading

External links

Scottish botanists
1933 births
2004 deaths
British women botanists
20th-century British botanists
20th-century British women scientists
Scottish women scientists
Scientists from Glasgow